Darren Robert Anderton (born 3 March 1972) is an English former professional footballer and pundit.

As a player, he was a midfielder who notably played in the Premier League for Tottenham Hotspur and Birmingham City. His twelve-year spell with Spurs yielded 299 league appearances, scoring 34 goals. He won the League Cup with Spurs in 1999, and was then runners-up in the same tournament again in 2002. He also played in the English Football League for Portsmouth and Wolverhampton Wanderers before finishing his career with AFC Bournemouth. In his final ever game as a professional player he came off the bench to score the winner with a spectacular volley in a 3–2 win for Bournemouth on 6 December 2008. He was capped 30 times by England, scoring seven goals and being ever present in the squads at UEFA Euro 1996 and 1998 FIFA World Cup.

Since retirement, Anderton has largely worked as a pundit, notably for Canada's The Sports Network.

Club career

Portsmouth
Anderton started his career in the Southampton Tyro League and played for Itchen Saints during a successful period for the side. His potential was evident and he was soon scouted and playing youth football at professional clubs.

Anderton was signed as an apprentice by Portsmouth manager Alan Ball, coming to prominence at 18 when he scored at Anfield in an FA Youth Cup match against Liverpool which ended 2–2. His first team debut came against Cardiff City in the second round of the League Cup in October 1990 as a substitute for youth team colleague Darryl Powell. Anderton made his full league debut against Wolverhampton Wanderers in a 0–0 draw, making 20 appearances in the 1990–91 season. Under new manager Jim Smith, Anderton became a regular in the attacking side of the 1991–92 season, scoring his first club goal in the season opener against Blackburn Rovers. His performances soon drew the attention of bigger clubs and after an impressive FA Cup run, during which he scored in a semi-final clash with Liverpool, he joined Tottenham Hotspur for £1.75 million in 1992.

Tottenham Hotspur
After a slow start, Anderton settled at Tottenham, playing as a right winger, forming part of an exciting attacking trio along with Teddy Sheringham and the young Nick Barmby. Two years later Terry Venables gave Anderton his England debut against Denmark in 1994. Anderton soon became a regular in the national side and turned down a move to Manchester United in the summer of 1995 following an exciting season spent playing with the likes of Jürgen Klinsmann at Tottenham, a decision that he later regretted.

Despite missing most of the 1995–96 season, first because of hernia surgery and then with a groin injury that kept him out for eight months, Anderton played an important part in the Euro 96 England team that reached the semi-finals and included Paul Gascoigne, Alan Shearer, Steve McManaman and Teddy Sheringham. In the semi final against Germany, the match went to golden goal extra time. Anderton came within inches of putting England into the final when his shot hit the post.

Injuries then limited Anderton's international appearances considerably. He missed most of the 1997–98 season but was recalled for Glenn Hoddle's squad for the 1998 FIFA World Cup in France, starting on the right wing in the first two matches ahead of an out-of-sorts David Beckham. Hoddle later said in his World Cup Diary that he thought Anderton was equally as good as Beckham at crossing and was a better defender. Hoddle said he had waited 18 months to play Beckham and Anderton together on the right side of midfield. It finally happened as David Batty was dropped and the now-focused Beckham was recalled for the third game against Colombia and played inside of Anderton. Anderton and Beckham were the England heroes as they both scored spectacular goals. In the second round against Argentina, England went on to lose on penalties. The following year Anderton won the League Cup with Tottenham, and signed a new reported £24,000-week contract in March. After being sidelined during Euro 2000 with an Achilles tendon injury, an extended run of fitness saw Anderton vying for a permanent place in the national team again. He played in England's 1–1 draw away to France in September 2000 and also featured against Italy the following November.

In the summer of 2001 Anderton was heavily linked with a move to Liverpool but he remained at Tottenham and his good form for Glenn Hoddle's team during the early part of the 2001–02 season earned his first call-up to Sven-Göran Eriksson's England squad for a friendly against Sweden in November. Anderton was again selected by Eriksson for England's next game, a friendly against Holland, in February 2002. He would have started the game but was forced to withdraw through injury. One notable statistic about Anderton's England career is that his last five caps were given to him by five different managers. These were: vs Czech Republic (18 November 1998) by Glenn Hoddle, vs France (10 February 1999) by Howard Wilkinson, vs France (2 September 2000) by Kevin Keegan, vs Italy (15 November 2000) by Peter Taylor and vs Sweden (10 November 2001) by Sven-Göran Eriksson.

Anderton continued to struggle badly with injuries for the rest of that season, missing out on a World Cup place. That summer the new Leeds United boss Terry Venables tried to recruit Anderton, but he turned down the move out of loyalty to Tottenham. In the summer of 2003 Portsmouth and West Ham made attempts to sign him, but Anderton opted against a move. He made a bright start to the 2003/04 season, scoring against Tottenham's bitter rivals Arsenal. However Hoddle was soon sacked and Spurs were in turmoil. Anderton remained at Tottenham until the summer of 2004. He was keen to remain at the club and was promised a new contract by David Pleat but the club, under the advice of incoming manager Jacques Santini, reneged. In all, he appeared in 364 games for Spurs, scoring 51 goals. Santini went on to last a grand total of 13 games at the club. Anderton has been promised a testimonial but this is yet to materialise.

Birmingham City and Wolves
Birmingham City swooped to sign Anderton on a free transfer for the 2004–05 season. His best moment for the Blues was scoring the winner in the 1–0 victory over Liverpool at Anfield.

Anderton left Birmingham on a free transfer after one year and reunited with Glenn Hoddle at Wolverhampton Wanderers, signing a one-year deal at the start of the 2005–06 season. He played 24 times for Wolves, scoring once in the league against Sheffield  Wednesday. He also scored in a 5–1 win over Chester City in the League Cup. His contract was not renewed at season's end.

AFC Bournemouth
On 8 September 2006, Anderton joined League One club AFC Bournemouth on a 'pay-as-you-play' basis, scoring a spectacular 40-yard free kick on his first-team debut against Scunthorpe. On 10 February 2007, he scored his first career hat-trick against Leyton Orient. Following a pre-season friendly with Portsmouth in July 2007, Portsmouth boss Harry Redknapp heaped praise on Anderton, telling the Bournemouth Daily Echo: "In the right team and with the right players around him, I honestly think he could still be playing in the Premiership".

At the start of the 2007/08 season, Anderton was named as the new Cherries club captain by manager Kevin Bond. Anderton spearheaded a survival bid at the end of the season, with the Cherries winning six of the seven last games, but, ultimately, a 1–1 draw with Carlisle on the final day saw Bournemouth relegated to League Two. Bournemouth were deducted 10 points earlier in the season for going into administration and had this not happened they would have finished in a respectable 15th.

Anderton signed a new one-year contract with Bournemouth at the start of the 2008/09 season which would have taken him past his 37th birthday. However, on 4 December 2008, Anderton announced he would retire on 7 December 2008, one day after his last game for club against Chester City. In his last match, versus Chester, Anderton bowed out of football with a fairytale finish, as he scored the winning goal with a spectacular volley in the 88th minute after coming on as a substitute in the second half of the game.

Personal life
Renowned as a player of huge potential, Anderton's career was constantly frustrated by injury, earning him the nickname "Sicknote", which was coined by Portsmouth goalkeeper Andy Gosney.

Anderton has worked as the in-studio analyst for Canadian network TSN's coverage of Euro 2012.

He now resides in California and states that he has no desire to move into coaching.

Career statistics

Club

International

Scores and results list England's goal tally first, score column indicates score after each Anderton goal.

Honours
Tottenham Hotspur
League Cup: 1998–99; runner-up: 2001–02

England U21
 Toulon Tournament: 1993

References

External links
Darren Anderton player profile at wolves.co.uk

1972 births
Living people
English footballers
Footballers from Southampton
Association football wingers
England international footballers
England under-21 international footballers
England B international footballers
UEFA Euro 1996 players
Premier League players
English Football League players
Portsmouth F.C. players
Tottenham Hotspur F.C. players
Birmingham City F.C. players
Wolverhampton Wanderers F.C. players
AFC Bournemouth players
1998 FIFA World Cup players